Alford is a town in Jackson County, Florida, United States. It is located in the Florida Panhandle near Marianna. The population was 489 at the 2010 census.

Geography
Alford is located at  (30.694794, –85.393119).

Demographics

2020 census

As of the 2020 United States census, there were 484 people, 250 households, and 159 families residing in the town.

2010 census
As of the census of 2010, there were 489 people and 202 households in the town.

The population was 48 percent male and 52 percent female. Twenty percent of the population was under 18 and 15.5 percent 65 or over. Ninety-three percent of the population was white and 4 percent Hispanic or Latino.

References

Towns in Jackson County, Florida
Towns in Florida